Marcy Park can refer to:

Marcy Park, a character in the musical The 25th Annual Putnam County Spelling Bee
Marcy Park, a park in Marcy-Holmes, Minneapolis, Minnesota
Marcy Park, a park located in University City, San Diego, California